Ramnathpur  is a village in Pakur district of Jharkhand state of India.

References

Villages in Pakur district